LBH may refer to:
Late Biblical Hebrew
LBH (gene)
London Borough of Hackney
London Borough of Haringey
London Borough of Harrow
London Borough of Havering
London Borough of Hillingdon
London Borough of Hounslow
Lyman–Birge–Hopfield bands, see absorption band
Palm Beach Water Airport (IATA airport code "LBH")